Aslamul Haque (14 May 1961 – 4 April 2021) was a Bangladeshi entrepreneur, businessman and politician. He was a Bangladesh Awami League politician and Jatiya Sangsad member from Dhaka-14 constituency since its inception in 2009 until his death in 2021.

Biography 
Haque attended National Bangla High School.

He was the founder and chairman of Maisha Group, a business conglomerate in Bangladesh. He began building his business in 1992. Maisha Group began as Maisha Property Development Ltd. He was the member of Commonwealth of Independent States-Bangladesh Chamber of Commerce and Industry. Maisha Group developed Arisha Private Economic Zone in Dhaka.

Controversy 
In March 2020, Bangladesh Inland Water Transport Authority sought to demolish apparent illegal structures owned by Haque in Dhaka. They demolished parts of a power plant owned by him.

References

2021 deaths
1961 births
People from Dhaka District
Awami League politicians
9th Jatiya Sangsad members
10th Jatiya Sangsad members
11th Jatiya Sangsad members